Zaro may refer to: 

 Zarathushtra - intermediate reconstructed form of 
 Çaro, Pyrénées-Atlantiques - in Basque orthography